Character Role Playing is a 1981 fantasy role-playing game supplement published by Ragnarok Enterprises.

Contents
Character Role Playing is a course in creatively role playing the most common fantasy character types.

Reception
Ronald Pehr reviewed Character Role Playing in The Space Gamer No. 49. Pehr commented that "Experienced role players don't need Character Role Playing, others won't buy it. Get it for new FRPG players (who don't yet worship the dice), if you can convince them to read and heed."

Reviews
Pegasus #8 (July/Aug., 1982)

References

Fantasy role-playing game supplements
Role-playing game supplements introduced in 1981